Dublin Dental University Hospital is a dental health and teaching facility in Lincoln Place, Dublin, Ireland.

History
The facility was established in a building off St Stephen's Green in 1879. It moved to a purpose-built building in Lincoln Place in 1895. Since the 1990s, the Trinity College School of Dental Science, established by amalgamating the dental schools of Trinity College Dublin, University College Dublin and the Royal College of Surgeons in Ireland, has been based in the hospital. The hospital was extended in 1998 and again in 2010, in the latter case with a four-storey atrium exhibiting a sculpture by Fergus Martin.

References

External links
Official site

Hospital buildings completed in 1895
Hospitals established in 1879
Teaching hospitals in Dublin (city)
1879 establishments in Ireland
Health Service Executive hospitals